MZKT-6922 is a Russian army 6×6 transporter erector launcher designed and developed by the MZKT in Belarus. It carries Tor, Osa, and Buk surface-to-air missile systems.

See also 

MAZ-7310
MZKT-79221
MZKT-7930

References

External links
 http://www.military-today.com/trucks/mzkt_6922.htm

Military vehicles of Russia
Self-propelled rocket launchers
Missile launchers
Military vehicles of Belarus